Scott Quinnell (born 20 August 1972) is a Welsh former dual-code rugby union and rugby league player who played in the 1990s and 2000s. He was a number 8 for Wales, Llanelli RFC, Llanelli Scarlets, Richmond and the British & Irish Lions in rugby union. He won 52 caps for Wales (seven as captain) and three for the Lions, and scored 11 international tries for Wales and one for the Lions.

In 1994 he changed rugby football codes from rugby union to rugby league when he transferred from Llanelli RFC to Wigan, and played two seasons, winning a league championship and two caps for Wales.

Biography
Scott was born in Morriston, Swansea, Glamorgan, Wales. He is the son of former Welsh international Derek Quinnell. His two brothers Craig and Gavin played professional rugby union. Gavin lost the sight in one eye after an incident in a 2010 match. The brothers are also nephews of Welsh international Barry John, and Quinnell's godfather was Mervyn Davies.

Early career
Quinnell first joined the Llanelli juniors aged 8 and he made his début as an 18-year-old back in 1990 against Pen-y-groes. He went on to represent Llanelli on 146 occasions, scoring 69 tries.

Quinnell first played for Wales as a blindside flanker in a 26–24 defeat against Canada in 1990. He was part of the 1994 Five Nations-winning Welsh team and was man of the match in Wales' 24–15 victory over France that year with a try and a breakaway to set up another try.

Rugby league
He switched to rugby league in 1994, joining Wigan. He stayed with Wigan for two years, and during this time he won the league. Quinnell played loose forward in Wigan's 25–16 victory over St. Helens in the 1996 Regal Trophy final. He also represented Wales in the 1995 Rugby League World Cup. He said that the toughest game of rugby he ever played was the quarter-final against Western Samoa.  Wales went out to England 25–10 in the semi-finals.

Return to union
Quinnell returned to rugby union with Richmond in 1996. He was selected for the 1997 Lions tour of South Africa but a double hernia operation forced him to leave the tour and he was replaced by Tony Diprose.

He came back to his beloved Stradey Park in 1998. During the 1998–99 season he did no conditioning work at all as he had rheumatoid arthritis in his left knee. For seven years he played through the pain barrier with the condition that seemed likely to end his career.

He was part of a Welsh team that won eight straight games before the 1999 World Cup and then reached the World Cup quarter-finals where they went out 24–9 to the eventual winners Australia. He captained Wales for the first time in a 23–13 defeat by South Africa at the Millennium Stadium. Quinnell played his last game for Wales as a replacement in a 32–21 win over Canada in 2002 after winning 52 caps.

He was again selected for the 2001 Lions tour to Australia where he played in all three tests, and scored a try in the first test in Brisbane.

After the Welsh domestic game went regional in 2003, he appeared 59 times for the Scarlets, scoring 32 tries. He was part of the Llanelli Scarlets team that won the Celtic League title in 2004.
 
Quinnell announced his retirement from rugby union at the end of the 2004–05 season in order to concentrate on his role as coach of the Llanelli RFC Welsh Premier Division team. A hand injury suffered in March 2005 forced him to end his career a few weeks prematurely. He played his final game in a testimonial match with fellow retiree Rob Howley at the Millennium Stadium. Quinnell's Britain & Ireland selection lost 57–67 to Howley's Rest of the World side.

After retirement
Quinnell currently regularly appears as a commentator and pundit on a number of Sky Sports televised rugby matches. He is also a People's Postcode Lottery ambassador and appears on the adverts. He is a co-presenter and coach (with Will Greenwood) of Sky's School of Hard Knocks TV series. He has had a recurring guest role as himself in the Sky 1 TV comedy series Stella. In 2017 he co-wrote (with psychologist Paul Boross) the book Leader On The Pitch, with a foreword written by Sir Clive Woodward.

An extra episode,  ('Language Road Trip: Christmas') was broadcast at the end of 2020, interviewing each of the celebrities about whether they were still making use of their Welsh and the opportunities they had had to use Welsh during lockdown.

Personal life
Quinnell is married to Nicola, and the couple have three children. Having lived all of his life in Llanelli, in early 2009 in light of his increased media commitments, the family moved to Kenilworth, Warwickshire, although they have since moved back to South Wales to a smallholding near Usk.

Quinnell is dyslexic, but was not diagnosed until his early 30s, when his lack of ability to read and write was correctly diagnosed. Having undertaken a series of therapies to resolve the condition, as of 2010, Quinnell is a popular speaker on the matter. He has represented the Welsh Dyslexia Project, and also completed an autobiography as part of the Accent Press Quick Reads series.

In August 2007 Quinnell was treated for serious injuries after slipping whilst entering a shower and falling through a glass shower door at his then home near Llanelli. He was taken to West Wales General Hospital in Carmarthen with a severed right triceps, and glass embedded in his right arm, hand and knee.

In 2017, Quinnell published a book on business leadership with Paul Boross.

References

External links
Statistics at wigan.rlfans.com
Sunday Morning with Scott Quinnell & Co (BBC Radio Wales)

1972 births
Living people
British & Irish Lions rugby union players from Wales
Dual-code rugby internationals
Llanelli RFC players
Sportspeople with dyslexia
Richmond F.C. players
Rugby league players from Swansea
Rugby union number eights
Rugby union players from Morriston
Scarlets players
Wales international rugby union players
Wales national rugby league team players
Wales rugby union captains
Welsh rugby league players
Welsh rugby union players
Wigan Warriors players